Kids Ocean Day HK  was organised by Ocean Recovery Alliance to celebrate Kids Ocean Day in Hong Kong.

Foundation
The Malibu Foundation, a California-based non-profit organisation, started Kids Ocean Day to connect children to the ocean and beaches, and to foster understanding of the environmental issues they face. The first Kids Ocean Day Hong Kong was celebrated 9 November 2012. Over 800 students, teachers and volunteers met at Repulse Bay and helped create a piece of aerial artwork featuring a Chinese white dolphin, organised by aerial artist John Quigley of Spectral Q. The design was based on 9-year-old Leung Man-Hin's artwork which won the drawing competition for the event.

Goal
To raise awareness, understanding and appreciation among Hong Kong youth about the state of the ocean and the health of its ecosystem.

Events
 Picture Drawing Competition
 Hong Kong Kids Ocean Film Festival
 Ocean Education Program for Schools
 Beach Education Class
 Human Aerial Art Project

References

External links
 Ocean Recovery Alliance
 Kids Ocean Week on Facebook
 Short Video Kids Ocean Day HK
 Extended Video Kids Ocean Day HK
 Malibu Foundation
 Spectral Q
 National CleanUp Day

Ocean pollution
Pollution